Herbert John Donald Shrimpton (12 April 1903 – 12 March 1979) was an English cricketer. Shrimpton was a right-handed batsman who bowled leg break. He was born at Worcester, Worcestershire, and attended the University of Bristol.

Shrimpton made his first-class debut for Gloucestershire against Middlesex in the 1923 County Championship at Lord's. Shrimpton made two further first-class appearances for the county in 1923, against Leicestershire at Aylestone Road, Leicester, and Yorkshire at Greenbank Cricket Ground, Bristol. In his three first-class matches, he scored 26 runs at an average of 5.20, with a high score of 14.

He died at Southwark, London, on 12 March 1979.

References

External links
Herbert Shrimpton at ESPNcricinfo
Herbert Shrimpton at CricketArchive

1903 births
1979 deaths
Sportspeople from Worcester, England
Alumni of the University of Bristol
English cricketers
Gloucestershire cricketers